Kreva Castle is the ruins of a major fortified residence of the Grand Dukes of Lithuania (Gediminas and Algirdas) in the village of Kreva, Belarus.

Algirdas's brother Kęstutis was imprisoned and murdered by Jogaila in the Kreva Castle in 1382. The Union of Krewo (Act of Krewo), the first step towards the Polish–Lithuanian Commonwealth, was signed in the castle three years later. The castle was sacked by the Crimean Tatars in the early 16th century and stood unoccupied for a long time. By the 19th century, much of the walls had crumbled away. World War I dealt a final blow to the decaying structure, since the castle stood on the front line between Russian and German armed forces. In the 19th and 20th centuries, the ruins were partially conserved, particularly by Poland in 1929. However, the monument has been decaying ever since.

References

External links

 Krevo Castle on official website of the Republic of Belarus
  Kreva Castle on globus.tut.by
  History of the Kreva Castle
  The Kreva Castle Charity Fund

Castles in Belarus
Ruins in Belarus
Former castles in Belarus
Buildings and structures in Grodno Region
Castles of the Grand Duchy of Lithuania